Ka Ka Ka Po is a 2016 Indian Tamil-language comedy film written and directed by P. S. Vijay. The film stars Kesavan and Sakshi Agarwal in the lead roles, with Subbu Panchu in a supporting role. The film was theatrically released in India on 8 July 2016.

Cast 

 Kesavan as Kannadasan
 Sakshi Agarwal as Kavita Punyakodi
 Subbu Panchu as Rishabarajan
 Karunas
 Robo Shankar
 Singampuli
 Powerstar Srinivasan
 M. S. Bhaskar
 Mayilswamy
 Madhan Bob
 Anu Mohan
 Sangili Murugan
 V. S. Raghavan
 Jaguar Thangam
 Vadivukkarasi
 Nirosha
 Rajashree
 Jangiri Madhumitha
 Nalini
Vijay Ganesh

Production 
The film was titled Ka Ka Ka Po, with a tagline of Kavithavum Kannadhasanum Kadhalika Poraanga. The makers of the film were briefly engaged in a tussle over the naming rights of the film with the team of Kadhalum Kadandhu Pogum (2016). Both films were referred to by the media as Ka Ka Ka Po, a phrase taken from a popular dialogue from Chimbu Deven's Imsai Arasan 23rd Pulikecei (2006). Though both films had different expansions of the phrase, director Vijay stated that he was apprehensive that his film might suffer due to the confusion. Both films later released without any problem.

For the film, Sakshi Agarwal underwent special training for stunt sequences, and also featured in a song, where she appeared in nine different get-ups. The song shoot for each look happened at different locations including Malaysia, Puducherry, and Hyderabad. The makers cast thirty three comedians in the film to play small roles.

The film's lead actor Keshavarajan Latchumanasami, who was debuting with the stage name of Kesavan, died in an accident in November 2015, before the release of the film.

Soundtrack

Release
The film opened to negative reviews from critics, with a reviewer from The Times of India stating "with a story which has almost no scope to keep the viewers entertained, the flimsy narration and sluggish making rubs salt into our wounds." The critic added "what is even more disappointing is the spectacle of a myriad talented comedians making ineffective appearances at regular intervals — all of them being wasted in inept roles".

References

External links 

2016 films
2010s Tamil-language films
Indian comedy films
2016 comedy films